Wissam Assimi (born 12 July 1976) is a retired Israeli footballer who now works as a manager.

References

External links
 

1991 births
Living people
Israeli footballers
Hapoel Dimona F.C. players
Hapoel Daliyat al-Karmel F.C. players
Bnei Sakhnin F.C. players
Maccabi Netanya F.C. players
Hapoel Beit She'an F.C. players
Hapoel Kafr Kanna F.C. players
F.C. Bu'eine players
Israeli football managers
People from Daliyat al-Karmel
Association football midfielders